Qorakoʻl also spelled as Karakul (قارەكول) is a city in the Bukhara Region of Uzbekistan. It is the capital of Qorakoʻl District (Qorakoʻl tumani). "Qorakoʻl" means "black lake" in Uzbek language. Its population is 22,300 (2016).

References

Populated places in Bukhara Region
Cities in Uzbekistan